Guards Brigade may refer to:

 Brigade of Guards, a formation of the British Army
 Brigade of the Guards, an Indian Army regiment
 Soviet Guards brigade, see Guards unit
 Presidential Guard Brigade (Nigeria)